Richard Spry (18 July 1862 – 10 November 1920) was an Australian cricketer. He played in one first-class match for Queensland in 1892/93.

See also
 List of Queensland first-class cricketers

References

External links
 

1862 births
1920 deaths
Australian cricketers
Queensland cricketers
Cricketers from Melbourne